Ainshval is the second highest mountain on the island of Rùm, in the Inner Hebrides of Scotland, after Askival.

It is part of the Rùm Cuillin, a range of rocky hills in the south of the island. The mountain is usually climbed as part of the classic travail of the Cuillin range

References

Marilyns of Scotland
Corbetts
Mountains and hills of the Scottish islands
Mountains and hills of Highland (council area)
Rùm